This is a timeline documenting the events of heavy metal in the year 1991.

Newly formed bands
108
A.N.I.M.A.L.
 Acid Bath
Acrimony
All Out War
 Angra
Anorexia Nervosa 
Arcade
 Arcturus
Atomic Opera
Avulsed
Beheaded
 Behemoth
 Betrayer, who assumed the name Belphegor in 1993
Bangalore Choir
Bethlehem
Blood Duster
Burzum
Clutch 
Coaltar of the Deepers
Cradle of Filth
Crash 
Creepmime 
Crematory 
Criminal 
Crimson Thorn
Damn the Machine
Defleshed
Deranged  
 Down
Dreams of Sanity
Dying Fetus
Eldritch
 Emperor
 Enslaved
Eternal Elysium
Eternal Oath
Evocation 
Far
Fair Warning
Fear of God  
Fleurety
Funeral 
godheadSilo
Graveland
Grief 
Gut
H-Blockx 
 Hank Williams III
Hardline
HIM 
Hypocrisy 
Ildjarn 
Illdisposed
Immortal 
Immortal Souls
 Incubus (not to be confused with the thrash metal Incubus)
Jackyl
Kalmah
Kataklysm
Katatonia
Kazik na Żywo
 Labyrinth
Machine Head
 Mercenary
Morgul
Mütiilation
 Nevermore
Nightfall 
Oppressor
Orphaned Land
Pain of Salvation
Paramæcium
Peach
Poema Arcanus
Poverty's No Crime
Powerman 5000
Pride & Glory
Pro-Pain
 Pyogenesis
Rage Against the Machine
Sadist 
Saturnus  
Satyricon
Scorn
Skepticism 
Skin Chamber
Snapcase
Stormlord
Strife
Svartsyn
Tad Morose
Unbroken
Unruly Child
Widowmaker
Zimmers Hole

Albums & EPs

 Altered State – Altered State
 Anacrusis – Manic Impressions 
 Anthrax – Attack of the Killer B's (comp)
 Armed Forces  – Take On the Nation
 Armored Saint – Symbol of Salvation
 Artch – For the Sake of Mankind
 Asphyx - The Rack
 Assück - Anticapital
 At the Gates - Gardens of Grief (EP)
 Atheist – Unquestionable Presence
 Atomgod – History Re-Written
 Autopsy – Mental Funeral
 Badlands – Voodoo Highway
 Bad Moon Rising – Full Moon Fever (EP)
 Bad Moon Rising – Bad Moon Rising
 Bang Tango – Dancin' on Coals
 Bathory – Twilight of the Gods
 Baton Rouge – Lights Out on the Playground
 Benediction - The Grand Leveller
 Blackeyed Susan – Electric Rattlebone
 Bolt Thrower – War Master
 Bonham – Mad Hatter (album)
 Bulletboys – Freakshow
 Cancer - Death Shall Rise
 Cannibal Corpse – Butchered at Birth
 Carcass - Necroticism – Descanting the Insalubrious
 Cathedral – Forest of Equilibrium
China – Go All the Way
 Civil Defiance – Abstract Reaction (EP)
 Conception – The last Sunset
 Confessor – Condemned
 Contraband – Contraband
 Alice Cooper – Hey Stoopid
 Coroner – Mental Vortex
 Corrosion of Conformity – Blind
 Crimson Glory – Strange and Beautiful
 Crowbar – Obedience thru Suffering 
 The Cult – Ceremony
 Cycle Sluts from Hell – Cycle Sluts from Hell
 Cyclone Temple – I Hate Therefore I Am
 D.A.D – Riskin It All
 Danger Danger – Screw it
 Dangerous Toys – Hellacious Acres
 Darkthrone – Soulside Journey
 Dark Angel – Time Does Not Heal
 Death – Human
 Deceased - Luck of the Corpse
 Deceased - Gut Wrench (EP)
 Deliverance – What a Joke
 Demolition Hammer – Tortured Existence
 Devastation – Idolatry
 Dirty Looks – Bootlegs
 Dismember – Like an Ever Flowing Stream
 Edge of Sanity - Nothing But Death Remains
 Emperor (US) – After the Storm (EP)
 Entombed – Clandestine
 Europe – Prisoners in Paradise
 Evildead – The Underworld
 Fates Warning – Parallels
 Fear of God – Within the Veil
 Follow for Now – Follow for Now
 The Four Horsemen – Nobody Said it Was Easy
 Galactic Cowboys – Galactic Cowboys
 Gamma Ray – Sigh No More
 General Surgery - Necrology (EP)
 Glory – 2 Forgive Is 2 Forget
 Gorguts - Considered Dead
 Grave - Into the Grave
 Grinder – Nothing Is Sacred
 Guns N' Roses – Use Your Illusion I and II
 Hammers Rule – Spontaneous Human Combustion
 Heathen – Victims of Deception
 Heavens Gate – Livin' in Hysteria
 Helloween – Pink Bubbles Go Ape
 Hexx – Morbid Reality
 Howe II – Now Hear This
 Iced Earth – Night of the Stormrider
 Ignorance – The Confident Rat
 Immolation – Dawn of Possession
 I, Napoleon – I, Napoleon
 Infectious Grooves – The Plague That Makes Your Booty Move...It's the Infectious Grooves
 Integrity – Those Who Fear Tomorrow
 Into Another – Into Another
 Intruder – Psycho Savant
 Kik Tracee – No Rules
 KingOfTheHill – Kingofthehill
 Kix – Hot Wire
 Richie Kotzen – Electric Joy
 Kyuss – Wretch
 Lacrimosa – Angst
 L.A. Guns – Hollywood Vampires
 Last Crack – Burning Time
 Loudness – On the Prowl
 Malevolent Creation - The Ten Commandments
 Yngwie Malmsteen – The Yngwie Malmsteen Collection (comp)
 Massacre - From Beyond
 Master - On The Seventh Day God Created...Master
 Master's Hammer – Ritual
 Matthias Steele – Haunting Tales of a Warrior's Past
 McAuley Schenker Group – M.S.G.
 McQueen Street – McQueen Street
 Meshuggah – Contradictions Collapse
 Metal Church – The Human Factor
 Metal Massacre - Metal Massacre XI (Compilation, various artists)
 Metallica – Metallica
 Mind Funk – Mind Funk
 Monster Magnet – 25...Tab
 Monster Magnet – Spine of God
 Vinnie Moore – Meltdown
 Morbid Angel – Abominations of Desolation 
 Morbid Angel – Blessed Are the Sick
 Morgoth - Cursed
 Mortal Sin – Every Dog Has Its Day
 Mortification – Mortification
 Mortician - Mortal Massacre
 Mötley Crüe – Decade of Decadence (comp)
 Motörhead – 1916
 Mr. Big – Lean into It
 Mr. Bungle – Mr. Bungle
 Nazareth - No Jive
 Nirvana – Nevermind
 Non-Fiction – Preface
 Nuclear Assault – Out of Order
 The Obsessed – Lunar Womb
 Osiris – Futurity and Human Depressions
 Overkill – Horrorscope
 Ozzy Osbourne – No More Tears
 Panic – Epidemic
 Paradise Lost – Gothic
 Pearl Jam – Ten
 Pestilence - Testimony of the Ancients
 Phantom – Phantom
 Pitchshifter – Industrial
 Poison – Swallow This Live (live)
 Poltergeist – Behind My Mask
 Powersurge – MCMXCI
 Praying Mantis – Predator in Disguise
 Primus – Sailing the Seas of Cheese
 Prong – Prove You Wrong
 Pungent Stench - Been Caught Buttering
 Queen – Greatest Hits II
 Queen – Innuendo
 Rage – Extended Power (EP)
 Ratt – Ratt & Roll 81-91 (comp)
 Red Hot Chili Peppers - Blood Sugar Sex Magik
 Reverend – Play God
 Ripping Corpse - Dreaming with the Dead
 Kane Roberts – Saints and Sinners
 Stephen Ross – Midnight Drive
 David Lee Roth – A Little Ain't Enough
Rotting Christ – Passage to Arcturo (EP)
 Root – Hell Symphony
 Rush – Roll the Bones
 Saigon Kick – Saigon Kick
 Sabbat – Envenom
 Samael – Worship Him
 Savatage – Streets: A Rock Opera
 Temple of the Dog – Temple of the Dog
 The Scream – Let It Scream
 The Screaming Jets – All for One
 Sentenced - Shadows of the Past
 Sepultura – Arise
 Slik Toxik – Smooth And Deadly (EP)
 Skid Row – Slave to the Grind
 Skyclad – The Wayward Sons of Mother Earth
 Slayer – Decade of Aggression (live)
 Solitude Aeturnus – Into the Depths of Sorrow
 Soundgarden – Badmotorfinger
 Stone – Emotional Playground
 Stryper – Can't Stop the Rock (comp)
 Suffocation – Effigy of the Forgotten
 Tesla – Psychotic Supper
 Therapy? – Baby Teeth
 Therion - Of Darkness...
 The Throbs – The Language of Thieves and Vgabonds
 Thin Lizzy – Dedication: The Very Best of Thin Lizzy (comp)
 Thorns – Grymyrk (demo)
 Tiamat - The Astral Sleep
 Titan Force – Winner/Loser
 Tourniquet – Psycho Surgery
 Tórr – Institut Klinické Smirti
 Tuff – What Comes Around Goes Around
 Tyketto – Don't Come Easy
 Type O Negative – Slow, Deep and Hard
 U.D.O. – Timebomb
 Ugly Kid Joe – As Ugly as They Wanna Be
 Unleashed - Where No Life Dwells
 Van Halen – For Unlawful Carnal Knowledge
 Velvet Viper – Velvet Viper
 Vengeance Rising - Destruction Comes
 Vicious Rumors – Welcome to the Ball
 Voivod – Angel Rat
 War Babies – War Babies
 Warrior Soul – Drugs, God and the New Republic
 White Lion – Mane Attraction
 Wrathchild America – 3-D
 Xentrix – Dilute to Taste (EP)
 XYZ – Hungry

Disbandments
 Death Angel (reformed in 2001)
 Whitesnake (reformed in 2002)
 Sanctuary (reformed in 2010)

Events
 Poison fires guitarist CC DeVille.  Conflict between Michaels and DeVille culminated in a fistfight backstage at the 1991 MTV Video Music Awards, provoked by DeVille's inept live performance. After bringing "Unskinny Bop" to a grinding halt, DeVille launched into "Talk Dirty To Me", forcing the band to switch songs in mid-performance. Deville was fired and replaced by Pennsylvanian guitarist Richie Kotzen.
Queen releases Innuendo.
 November 24: Queen's Freddie Mercury dies of AIDS induced bronchial pneumonia.
Def Leppard guitarist Steve Clark dies on January 8 due to compression of the brain stem from excessive alcohol mixed with anti-depressants and painkillers (as a result of a rib injury).
Queen's "Bohemian Rhapsody" goes to number one in the UK for the second time, the only song to ever go to number one more than once in the same version. It has now spent 14 weeks at number one.
Extreme's hit single "More Than Words" reaches number one on the United States Billboard Hot 100 chart. This brought the band to their first mainstream success in North America.
KISS Drummer - Eric Carr dies at age 41 on November 24 (The same day as Freddie Mercury). As a tribute, the group's 1992 release Revenge featured what is said to be the only drum solo Carr ever recorded with the band, which was titled "Carr Jam 1981".
Skid Row's second album Slave to the Grind becomes the only 90s classic heavy metal album to debut at No.1 in the Billboard music charts in the 90s.
Metallica's self-titled Black Album becomes the first album by a thrash metal band to hit No.1 in the Billboard music charts.
Guns N' Roses set a record when their albums Use Your Illusion I and Use Your Illusion II debut at the top two positions of the Billboard 200, the only time a rock band has ever achieved this
Mayhem's vocalist, Per Yngve Ohlin aka Dead, kills himself by shooting himself in the head with a shotgun and slitting his wrists and throat with a hunting knife. He left a note reading "excuse all the blood". Photographs of his corpse taken by bandmate, Euronymous, were later used as cover art for the bootleg album Dawn of the Black Hearts.
 Europe release the 5th album titled Prisoners in Paradise. It's Europe's last studio album before they decide to take a long break.
 "Monsters in Moscow" takes place at Moscow's Tushino Airfield featuring AC/DC, The Black Crowes, EST, Metallica and Pantera.

1990s in heavy metal music
Metal